Voting for the second Shorty Awards opened on January 5, 2010, in 26 official categories. A Real-Time Photo of the Year category was added to the list of official categories for the first time, recognizing the best photo posted to services such as Twitpic, Yfrog, or Facebook.

The second Shorty Awards competition introduced a panel of judges called the Real-Time Academy of Short Form Arts & Sciences whose members were Craig Newmark, David Pogue, Kurt Andersen, Caterina Fake, Joi Ito, Frank Moss, Alberto Ibargüen, Sreenath Sreenivasan, MC Hammer, Alyssa Milano and Jimmy Wales. After public nominations determined the finalists, the academy decided on the winners.

Winners were announced at a ceremony held in the Times Center in The New York Times building in Manhattan, and were streamed online. The ceremony was hosted by CNN anchor Rick Sanchez, who presented awards in the official categories as well as the newly added Real-Time Photo of the Year and a special humanitarian award.

Winners 
The second annual winners by category:

Special Awards

References 

Shorty Awards
2010 in Internet culture